Hélène Harder, is a French-German filmmaker, cinematographer, videographer, writer as well as a university academic by profession. She is known for the critically acclaimed award winning documentary films Ladies' Turn and Le vertige de Stendhal.

Personal life
Hélène Harder studied philosophy at the Ecole Normale Supérieure de Paris.

Career
In 2012, after training at University of California, Berkeley, she worked in New York and Paris. Then in that year, she made her first feature documentary Ladies’ Turn based in Senegal. The documentary received positive acclaim from critics and was selected for festivals in more than 15 countries. She received four awards, and it was broadcast on TV5Monde, Arte and PBS.

Apart from cinema, she also worked as a videographer and photographer especially for dance companies, theatre, contemporary art venues and online media.

Filmography

References

External links
 

Living people
French film directors
École Normale Supérieure alumni
University of California, Berkeley alumni
Year of birth missing (living people)